Unvanquished City is a 1950 Polish drama film directed by Jerzy Zarzycki. It was entered into the 1951 Cannes Film Festival.

Cast
 Jan Kurnakowicz as Piotr Rafalski
 Zofia Mrozowska as Krystyna
 Igor Śmiałowski as Andrzej
 Jerzy Rakowiecki as Jan
 Kazimierz Sapinski as Julek
 Henryk Borowski
 Lucjan Dytrych as Obergruppenführer Fischer
 Jerzy Kaliszewski as German Officer
 Andrzej Łapicki as SS Officer
 Alfred Łodziński as Niemiecki szabrownik
 Michal Melina as German General
 Jerzy Pietraszkiewicz as Russian Officer
 Jan Świderski as Russian Major
 Jerzy Wasowski as German Officer
 Kazimierz Wilamowski as German Officer
 Mieczysław Wojnicki as German soldier

References

External links

1950 films
1950 drama films
Polish drama films
1950s Polish-language films
Polish black-and-white films
Films directed by Jerzy Zarzycki